Kham is an area of eastern Tibet.

Kham may also refer to:

Kham Magar, an ethnic minority in the Himalayan foothills of western Nepal
Kham language or Khamkura, the Tibeto-Burman language spoken by Kham Magars
KHAM, a USA radio station
Kham District, a district of Xiangkhouang Province, Laos
Naw Kham, Burmese drug lord
KHAM theory, in politics of Gujarat
 Kham (instrument), a percussion folk instrument from Tripura